Fotbal Club Dacia Chișinău, commonly known as Dacia Chișinău or simply Dacia, was a Moldovan football club based in Chișinău, which last played in the village of Speia, Anenii Noi. They participated in the Divizia Națională, the top division in Moldovan football.

The club's name came from Dacia, an ancient civilization which covered parts of modern Moldova. Established in 1999, it entered the Moldovan "A" Division in 2000 and was promoted to the first division two years later. They won their first league title in the 2010–11 season, thereby qualifying for the preliminaries of the UEFA Champions League. The team has also taken part in the Europa League on five occasions, but never reached the group stage. The club was disbanded after the 2017 Moldovan National Division season.

History

Early history (1999–2002) 
FC Dacia was founded in 1999 by Marin Livadaru, Igor Ursachi, Valeriu Plujnic and Alexandru Șcaruba. The team was composed of goalkeeper Ghenadie Gariuc and outfield players including Alexandru Golban, Cornel Popov, Ruslan Rașcu, Serghei Coșciug, Cornel Gafton, Veaceslav Titov, Alexandru Tracalov. The club's initial aim was to compete in the Moldovan "A" Division (second tier).  Dacia debuted in this league during the 2000–01 season, while Gabriel Stati took over as president in autumn 2000. The club came 4th in its first season before being promoted to the top-flight Moldovan National Division the following season.

National Division (2002–10) 
Dacia won their first National Division match 1–0 against Nistru Otaci, and ended the 2002–03 season in 4th with qualification to the Intertoto Cup as a result. Here they defeated the Faeroese club GÍ Gøta and Albanian side Partizani Tirana, against whom they five unanswered goals over the two-legged fixture (2–0 and 3–0). Dacia were subsequently eliminated by Germans Schalke 04, losing both legs (1–0 and 2–1).

Before the 2003–04 season, former Dacia player and second-team coach Emil Caras took over as head coach, leading the side to 5th place in the league and a Moldovan Cup semi-final defeat against fellow Chișinău-based side Zimbru Chișinău. Durfing that cup-run, Dacia recorded the victory in its history, 9–0 against FC Florești.

The 2004–05 season saw Dacia qualify for the UEFA Cup for the first time after a third-place finish in the league. The Wolves also finished as runners-up in the Moldova Cup after a dramatic loss to Nistru Otaci. Dacia were knocked out of the 2005-06 UEFA Cup in the first round against the Swiss Challenge League team FC Vaduz, losing 2–0 away but winning the home leg 1–0 though Vladimir Jăpălău. The subsequent league campaign ended in sixth position, along with defeat in the Moldova Cup semi-finals against Nistru Otaci. However, Dacia was the winner of a friendly tournament named the Turkmenistan President's Cup in February 2006, winning 4–3 in the final and collecting $20,000 US dollars as a prize.

After finishing 4th in the 2006–07 season, Dacia qualified for the 2007 Intertoto Cup, and advanced past the Azerbaijani club Baku FC in the first round via a penalty shoot-out, with Dacia's goalkeeper Mihai Moraru saving. It took another shoot-out in the second round to defeat Swiss club St Gallen. Dacia's third-round opponents were German club Hamburg, whose team of internationals revolving around Dutch playmaker Rafael van der Vaart drew 1–1 in Moldova, but won 4–0 in the return leg to knock Dacia out. The Yellow Wolves received a high assessment from local experts and Dacia were named the Top Team of 2007 by the Moldova Football Association. 

The subsequent 2007–08 league campaign brought Dacia's highest-placed finish as of then, partly due to new vice-president Timur Kuriev who found Russian investors. After the mid-season break, Dacia won five matches in a row to cut their deficit behind holders and league leaders Sheriff Tiraspol to a single point before their encounter on 30 March, which was won by Sheriff. By finishing in second, Dacia made the qualifying rounds of the UEFA Cup and were defeated 4–2 on aggregate by Serbian club Borac Čačak in the first round.

Dacia finished as runners-up to Sheriff again in 2008–09, and also reached their second Moldovan Cup final, which they lost 2–0 to Sheriff on 23 May. During the season, manager Emil Caras moved to FC Tiraspol and was replaced by the Ukrainian Roman Pilipchuk, while at the end of the season Victor Bulat received the People's Choice Award. Dacia started the 2009-10 Europa League in the second qualifying round where they were defeated 3–0 on aggregate by Slovak team MŠK Žilina.

In the 2009–10 season, Dacia were in the third place over the mid-season break, two points off first, but ended the season in 5th. Pilipchuk was replaced as manager by Veaceslav Semionov, and Rustam Polonkoev took over as president. The team made the Moldovan Cup final for the second consecutive season, and were again defeated 2–0 by Sheriff Tiraspol.

League success (2010–2018) 
Dacia began the 2010–11 season in a Europa League qualifier against Montenegrin club FK Zeta, winning on the away-goals rule after a 1–1 aggregate draw, and were then knocked out 2–0 on aggregate by Swedish team Kalmar FF. The Russian coach Igor Dobrovolskiy was appointed as head coach of Dacia before the league season began. Dacia were the sole unbeaten side in the league by their 17th match, which they lost 3–0 to Sheriff Tiraspol. Following that result, they remained unbeaten for the remaining 22 league games of the season. Dacia won their first, and so far only, Moldovan National Division title in 2010–11, finishing 9 points ahead of runners-up Sheriff and denying the Tiraspol club an eleventh consecutive title.

Also that season, Dacia signed an agreement with the Buiucani sports school to create a reserve team, Dacia Buiucani.

Before the 2011–12 season, Dacia won the revived Moldovan Super Cup against Iskra-Stal Rîbnița, with the only goal of the game coming from new signing Vasili Pavlov. In July 2011, Dacia made their UEFA Champions League debut in the second qualifying round, against Georgian champions Zestafoni. Despite winning the home leg 2–0, Dacia lost 3–0 in the return leg and were eliminated. Dobrovolski was replaced with Igor Negrescu during the league season, and Dacia finished as runners-up as Sheriff regained their title.

Dacia entered the 2012-13 UEFA Europa League in the first qualifying round, where they beat Slovenians Celje 1–0 in each leg. In the second qualifying round, against IF Elfsborg of Sweden, Dacia won the first leg 1–0 before losing the second 2–0 away and were subsequently eliminated.

On 13 March 2018, Dacia announced that they would not be participating in the 2018 Moldovan National Division.

League history

Honours

Leagues 
Divizia Națională
Winners (1): 2010–11
Runners-up (7): 2007–08, 2008–09, 2011–12, 2012–13, 2014–15, 2015–16, 2016–17
Divizia A
Winners (1): 2001–02

Cups 
Cupa Moldovei
Runners-up (4): 2004–05, 2008–09, 2009–10, 2014–15
Supercupa Moldovei
Winners (1): 2011

European record 
UEFA Cup/Europa League

UEFA Champions League

UEFA Intertoto Cup

Chairman FC Dacia

Managers 

  Igor Ursachi (1999–2003)
  Emil Caras (2003 – May 3, 2008)
  Vasile Coșelev (caretaker) (May 3, 2008 – Oct 2, 2008)
  Roman Pylypchuk (Oct 2, 2008 – Aug 31, 2009)
  Sergiu Botnaraș (caretaker) (Sep 1, 2009 – Dec 10, 2009)
  Veaceslav Semionov (caretaker) (Dec 23, 2009 – Jul 5, 2010)
  Igor Dobrovolski (Jul 5, 2010 – May 7, 2012)
  Igor Negrescu (caretaker) (May 7, 2012 – Jun 4, 2012)
  Igor Dobrovolski (Jun 4, 2012 – Jun 8, 2013)
  Igor Negrescu (Jun 8, 2013 – Jan 9, 2014)
  Dejan Vukićević (Jan 9, 2014 – Nov 2, 2014)
  Veaceslav Semionov (caretaker) (Nov 2, 2014 – Jan 20, 2015)
  Oleg Kubarev (Jan 20, 2015 – Mar 9, 2015)
  Veaceslav Semionov (caretaker) (Mar 9, 2015 – Apr 26, 2015)
  Igor Dobrovolski (Apr 26, 2015 – Aug 4, 2015)
  Oleg Valeriyovych Bezhenar (Aug 4, 2015 – 2017)

References

External links 

 Official site 
 Fans website 
 Profile at DiviziaNationala.com 

 
Dacia
Dacia Chisinau, FC
Association football clubs disestablished in 2018
1999 establishments in Moldova
2018 disestablishments in Moldova
Defunct football clubs in Moldova